Mainmast Peak is a  mountain summit in British Columbia, Canada.

Description

Mainmast Peak is located in the Battle Range of the Selkirk Mountains and it is the highest peak on Schooner Ridge. Precipitation runoff from the mountain drains north into Butters Creek and south into Houston Creek which are both tributaries of the Duncan River. Mainmast Peak is more notable for its steep rise above local terrain than for its absolute elevation. The nearest higher neighbor is Mount Butters,  to the west. The first ascent of Mainmast's summit was made in 1972 by Andrew J. Kauffman II, Judge David Michael, Arnold Wexler, and John Markel.

Etymology

The landform was named by Andrew J. Kauffman II who imagined the peaks on Schooner Ridge as resembling sails on a four-masted ship. The name follows the nautical naming theme for individual peaks on Schooner Ridge. The mountain's toponym was officially adopted on October 3, 1973, by the Geographical Names Board of Canada.

Climate

Based on the Köppen climate classification, Mainmast Peak is located in a subarctic climate zone with cold, snowy winters, and mild summers. Winter temperatures can drop below −20 °C with wind chill factors below −30 °C.

See also
Geography of British Columbia

References

External links
 Mainmast Peak: Weather forecast
 Mainmast Peak: Mountain-forecast.com

Two-thousanders of British Columbia
Selkirk Mountains
Kootenay Land District